Lin Shihong (林士弘) (died 622) was an agrarian king who rose against the rule of the Chinese Sui Dynasty near the end of Emperor Yang's reign.  For several years, he controlled most of modern Jiangxi and Guangdong, but was then under attack by others, gradually reduced to fighting a guerrilla war against Tang Dynasty.  He died in 622, and his followers scattered.

Initial uprising 

Virtually nothing is known about Lin Shihong's background, other than that he was from Rao Province (饒州, roughly modern Shangrao, Jiangxi).  In 616, he followed an agrarian rebel from the same locale, Cao Shiqi, in rising against Sui Dynasty rule.  Cao claimed the title of the Prince of Yuanxing and made Lin a major general.  Later that year, Emperor Yang of Sui sent the official Liu Ziyi to attack Cao, and Cao was killed by an arrow in battle.  Lin took over Cao's troops and battled Liu at Lake Poyang, killing Liu in battle.  Lin gained the allegiance of over 100,000 men.  Around the new year 617, Lin claimed the title of Emperor of Chu, and he captured a number of commanderies in modern Jiangxi.  It was said that the local gentry killed many of the Sui commandery governors and county magistrates to submit to him.  By this point, his territory went as far north as Jiujiang (九江, in modern Jiujiang, Jiangxi) and as far as Panyu (番禺, in modern Guangzhou, Guangdong).

Gradual loss of power 
After that point on, however, territorial expansions by Lin Shihong were rarely mentioned in historical accounts; rather, contractions were mentioned.  For example, around the new year 618, it was mentioned that Zhang Shan'an, a rebel leader from Fangyu (方與, in modern Xuzhou, Jiangsu), crossed the Yangtze River south to submit to Lin, but after Lin, not trusting his intentions, settled Zhang in outside his capital Yuzhang (豫章, in modern Nanchang, Jiangxi), Zhang became resentful and launched a surprise attack on Yuzhang, defeating Lin's forces and burning the exterior walls of Yuzhang, causing Lin to move his capital to Nankang (南康, in modern Ganzhou, Jiangxi).  Subsequently, another rebel leader, Xiao Xian the Prince of Liang, sent his general Su Hu'er to attack Yuzhang, capturing it, prompting Lin to further retreat to Yugan (餘干, in modern Shangrao).

In 618, the Sui official Feng Ang, whose clan had controlled a number of commanderies in modern Guangdong and Hainan for several generations, submitted to Lin, although when Lin tried to persuade the Sui official Qiu He, who controlled modern northern Vietnam, to do the same, Qiu refused, and subsequently submitted to Xiao after hearing that Emperor Yang had been killed at Jiangdu (江都, in modern Yangzhou, Jiangsu) in a coup led by the general Yuwen Huaji.  By late 620, it also appeared that Feng was no longer submitting to Lin, for he attacked and captured the rebel leaders Gao Facheng and Shen Baoche, who had taken over Guang (廣州, roughly modern Guangzhou) and Xin (新州, roughly modern Yunfu, Guangdong) Prefectures respectively and submitted to Lin.

Brief recovery and eventual dissipation 
In 621, the Tang Dynasty general Li Xiaogong destroyed Xiao Xian's state of Liang, seizing most of Liang territory and some of the troops, but much of the Liang troops fled and joined Lin, and Lin's military strength recovered.  In fall 622, however, Feng officially submitted to Tang.  Later that year, Lin sent his brother Lin Yaoshi the Prince of Poyang to attack Tang's Xun Prefecture (循州, roughly modern Huizhou, Guangdong), and the Tang prefect Yang Lüe defeated and killed Lin Yaoshi.  Further, the Chu general Wang Rong then surrendered Nanchang Prefecture (南昌州, roughly modern Jiujiang).  In fear, in winter 622, Lin offered to surrender to Tang, but soon regretted it, abandoning his capital Yugan and fled to Ancheng (安成, in modern Ji'an, Jiangxi), taking up positions in mountain caves, and the people of the region largely joined him.  The Tang general Ruogan Ze attacked him, however, and defeated him, but was unable to capture him.  However, Lin soon died, and his followers scattered, ending his state of Chu.

Notes 

Sui dynasty people
Generals from Jiangxi
Chinese emperors
622 deaths
7th-century Chinese monarchs
People from Shangrao
Year of birth unknown
Transition from Sui to Tang
Founding monarchs